Gallatin is a city in and the county seat of Sumner County, Tennessee. The population was 30,278 at the 2010 census and 44,431 at the 2020 census. Named for United States Secretary of the Treasury Albert Gallatin, the city was established on the Cumberland River and made the county seat of Sumner County in 1802. It is located about 30.6 miles northeast of the state capital of Nashville, Tennessee.

Several national companies have facilities or headquarters in Gallatin, including Facebook, Gap, Inc.,  Beretta and Servpro Industries, Inc. Gallatin was formerly the headquarters of Dot Records. The city is also the site of Volunteer State Community College, a two-year college with more than 70 degree programs. In 2017, Gallatin was ranked as "The Nicest Place In America" by Reader's Digest.

History
Gallatin was established in 1802 as the permanent county seat of Sumner County, in what is called the Middle Tennessee region of the state. The town was named after Albert Gallatin, Secretary of Treasury to Presidents Thomas Jefferson and James Madison. Andrew Jackson became one of the first to purchase a lot when the town was surveyed and platted in 1803. The town was built around a traditional plan of an open square. Jackson founded the first general store in Gallatin.

In 1803, the first county courthouse and jail were built on the central town square. In 1815, the town was incorporated. In the mid-20th century, it operated under a charter established by a 1953 Private Act of the State Legislature.

American Civil War
During the secession crisis just before the American Civil War, the citizens of Gallatin hoped to remain neutral; they were opposed to secession from the Union. Once the fighting began, however, they gave almost unanimous support to the Confederacy and volunteered to serve in defense of their state.

The Union Army captured Gallatin in February 1862, following Ulysses S. Grant's capture of Fort Donelson. Gallatin was strategic both because of the railroad, which ran east-west through the state, and its location on the Cumberland River, both of which the Union Army sought to control. In July 1862, General John Hunt Morgan recaptured Gallatin and held it until October, when the Confederate forces fell back to Chattanooga.

In November 1862, Union General Eleazar A. Paine retook the town, and Union troops occupied it throughout the remainder of the war and into 1867. Paine was notoriously cruel and was replaced in command before the end of the war because of his behavior. Alice Williamson, a local 16-year-old girl, kept a diary during 1864 and described Paine's execution of alleged spies without trial, some in the public square. Others were taken to the river and shot there. The long occupation, in which the troops lived off the land, disrupted civil society in the region.

Even before the Emancipation Proclamation in January 1863, many enslaved African Americans freed themselves by leaving farms and plantations with their families to join the Union troops in Gallatin and other parts of the state. The Army established a contraband camp here. The ex-slaves were provided food and housing, and put to work. In 1864 schools were set up in the camp to teach both children and adults to read and write.

In July 1863, some 200 local ex-slaves were among the first in the state to volunteer for the United States Colored Troops (USCT), enlisting at the Gallatin public square. They were assigned to the 13th Tennessee at Nashville. About two months later a full regiment of 1,000 men, the 14th Tennessee USCT at Gallatin, was recruited from ex-slaves in Nashville, Gallatin and Murfreesboro.  

Men from Gallatin were among those from the 12th and 13th TN Infantry USCT who built a rail line through nearby Waverly, Tennessee and the earthen Fort Hill near that town for regional defense.

The long enemy occupation drained the area of resources. Union troops confiscated livestock and crops from local farms. By the end of the war, widespread social and economic breakdown existed in the area, accompanied by a rise in crime. Occupation forces of the Union Army remained in Gallatin until 1870 after the war.

Through this period, many freedmen had moved from the farms into town, to gather in black communities away from white oversight. At the same time, many white residents moved from town out to farms to avoid the occupying troops. The area lost numerous men to the war and took years to recover. Its continued reliance on agriculture slowed the economy, and planters and other employers struggled with the shift to a free labor system.

Cholera, 1873
In summer 1873, Gallatin was devastated by an epidemic of cholera, which was part of a pandemic that had started in India in 1865. It moved west into Europe, and finally was carried by passengers on ships across the Atlantic Ocean, the third such pandemic to reach the United States. In the Mississippi River system, it started with cases first recorded in New Orleans in February 1873. The disease spread upriver with travelers to ports along the Mississippi River and its tributaries. The poor sanitation of the period resulted in contamination of water sources, a primary means of disease transmission.

The first case in Gallatin was recorded on May 29, and the patient died. During June, 68 people died in the small town, including many children. By August, the disease had largely burned out. Overall, Sumner County had an estimated 120 deaths that year from cholera, with four-fifths of them suffered by African Americans.<ref name="cholera">John M. Woodworth, "The Cholera Epidemic of 1873 in the United States", Sumner County, pp. 159-163. Reports Prepared Under the Direction of the Surgeon-General of the Army.</ref> An 1874 congressional report said that cholera had been documented in 264 towns and 18 states.

Nashville had 603 fatal cases from June 7 to 29, with 72 people dying on the day of highest fatalities. In the United States, some 50,000 people died of cholera during this pandemic, including 4,000 in Saint Louis and 3,500 in New Orleans.

Gradually through the late 19th century, Gallatin and its surroundings regained some steady growth. The area was primarily agricultural until the middle of the 20th century.

Mid-20th century to present
By 1970, industrialization and urbanization had resulted in half the county population being considered urban (including suburbs). In 1992, Gallatin was surpassed by Hendersonville as the largest city in the county, though the former remains the county seat. Today, it serves in part as a bedroom commuter suburb to the larger city and state capital of Nashville, some 30 miles to the southwest.

On April 7, 2006, a tornado struck the city, killing seven people and injuring 128 others. Volunteer State Community College sustained major damage. This tornado was part of a massive tornado outbreak.

Geography
Gallatin has variety of natural landscapes: open fields, forests, hills, and lakes. The city is located on Station Camp Creek, 3 mi (5 km) north of the Cumberland River, which was the chief route of transportation in the county's early years of settlement.

Old Hickory Lake, a man-made lake built by the U.S. Army Corps of Engineers as a result of a dam and lock on the Cumberland River, is located southwest of the city near Hendersonville.

Gallatin was on the path of the total solar eclipse of August 21, 2017.  Totality of the eclipse, lasting 2 minutes, 38.7 seconds, occurred just before 1:30 PM local DST time (18:28:52.3 UTC)

Climate
The coolest month is January, and July is the warmest. The maximum average precipitation occurs in March.

Demographics

2020 census

As of the 2020 United States census, there were 44,431 people, 14,692 households, and 9,948 families residing in the city.

2010 census
At the 2010 United States Census, there were 30,278 people, 11,871 households and 7,859 families residing in the city. The population density was 1,376.27 per square mile, and the housing unit density was 539.59 units per square mile. The racial makeup was 77.66% White, 14.67% Black or African American, 0.29% Native American, 0.76% Asian, 0.15% Pacific Islander, 4.38% from other races, and 2.08% from two or more races. Those of Hispanic or Latino origins were 8.04% of the population.

Of the 11,871 households, 29.23% had children under the age of 18 living in them, 45.96% were married couples living together, 4.52% had a male householder with no wife present, 15.73% had a female householder with no husband present, and 33.80% were not families; 27.19% of all households were made up of individuals, and 10.72% had someone living alone who was 65 years of age or older. The average household size was 2.48 and the average family size was 3.01.

Of the 30,278 residents, 24.21% were under the age of 18, 62.20% were between the ages of 18 and 64, and 13.59% were 65 years of age or older. The median age was 36.6 years; 51.00% of the residents were female and 48.00% were male.

The median household income was $43,770 and the median family income was $51,553. Males had a median income of $38,818 and females $32,997. The per capita income was $22,230. About 12.9% of families and 16.6% of the population were below the poverty line, including 24.8% of those under the age of 18 and 10.9% of those age 65 and over.

2000 census
At the 2000 census, there were 23,230 people, 8,963 households and 6,193 families residing in the city. The population density was 1,057.3 per square mile (408.2/km2). The 9,600 housing units averaged 436.9 per square mile (168.7/km2).  The racial makeup was 78.30% White, 17.57% African American, 0.30% Native American, 0.42% Asian, 0.07% Pacific Islander, 2.02% from other races, and 1.32% from two or more races. Hispanics or Latinos of any race were 3.45% of the population.

Of the 8,963 households, 32.5% had children under the age of 18 living with them, 48.0% were married couples living together, 16.1% had a female householder with no husband present, and 30.9% were not families; 26.5% of all households were made up of individuals, and 11.0% had someone living alone who was 65 years of age or older. The average household size was 2.50 and the average family size was 2.99.

25.4% of the population were under the age of 18, 9.4% from 18 to 24, 29.6% from 25 to 44, 21.9% from 45 to 64, and 13.7% who were 65 years of age or older. The median age was 36 years. For every 100 females, there were 90.7 males. For every 100 females age 18 and over, there were 86.8 males.

The median household income was $34,69, and the median family income was $41,899. Males had a median income of $30,620 and females $22,696 for females. The per capita income was $18,550. About 10.8% of families and 14.4% of the population were below the poverty line, including 20.4% of those under age 18 and 13.3% of those age 65 or over.

Economy
In May 2007, the unemployment rate in Sumner County was 3.8%, which was 0.7% below the national rate. The total number of workers in the county was 79,620.

The top four major employers in Gallatin, in order, are GAP, Inc., Sumner Regional Medical Center, Volunteer State Community College, and RR Donnelley. Gap employs 1,250 workers The Tennessee Valley Authority operates a coal-fired power plant in Gallatin.

In 2015, the Italian firearms manufacturer Beretta moved its U.S. production facility to Gallatin from Accokeek, Maryland.

Arts and culture
Gallatin has a modern 10-screen movie theater, NCG Gallatin Cinema. It has a completely restored single-screen theater, called The Palace, built in 1908. There is also a public city library.

Annual events include the Sumner County Fair, held during the last week of August, a Fall Festival held on the public square, and the Gallatin Christmas Parade.

The yearly Candlelight Cemetery Tour is held annually on the first Saturday in October. It is held in the city's old cemetery, located close to the town square. Actors and actresses depict various historical figures who lived in and around Gallatin during its 200 years of history — particularly those who lived before 1900 — from lawyers and doctors to business people to various persons of note in the community. Information on these individuals is gathered from various historical documents (legal papers, family journals, etc.). The event is sponsored by the Sumner County Historical Society in association with the local county museum (see below). Proceeds from the annual event go towards supporting the museum.

Museums and other points of interest
The Sumner County Museum in Gallatin houses a number of artifacts of historical significance to the city and the county.

The city has several architecturally significant buildings listed on the National Register of Historic Places and a central historic district. Restored homes that are open to the public include Cragfont, Rosemont and Trousdale Place.

Parks and recreation
Parks
Gallatin has six parks that allow for various sports and activities, including: baseball, basketball, beach volleyball, disc golf, fishing, American football, horseshoes, skateboarding, soccer, softball, swimming, tennis, walking and volleyball. These parks are:
 Clearview Park
 Lock 4 Park
 Municipal Park
 Rogers Field
 Thompson Park
 Triple Creek Park

Old Hickory Lake is also available for boating, fishing, swimming and related activities.

Recreation
Gallatin offers Cal Ripken and Babe Ruth baseball for ages 5–15 with the Kiwanis Club and Little League Baseball with the American Legion. Slow-pitch girls' softball leagues are also present. Basketball, American football, tennis, and soccer leagues are also available for various ages.

The Gallatin Civic Center has a swimming pool, a running/walking track, racquetball court, and basketball courts.

Gallatin has three golf courses:
 Long Hollow Golf Club – a public, 18-hole course built in 1983
 Gallatin Country Club – a private, 9-hole course built in 1948
 The Club at Fairview – a private, 36-hole course built in 2004

Gallatin has one disc golf course:
 Triple Creek Disc Golf Course – a public, 18-hole course

Triple Creek is maintained by the City of Gallatin with assistance from the Sumner County Disc Golf Association (SCDGA). The SCDGA holds several events a month at Triple Creek DGC including Wednesdays Random Draw Doubles and a SCDGA Bag Tag that rotates between Triple Creek DGC and Sanders Ferry Park DGC.

Government
Gallatin has a Mayor-Council government (Weak Mayor Form). The City Council is made up of seven elected officials: five are elected from single-member districts within the city limits, and two members are at-large. Of these seven council members, one is elected by members of the council as Vice-Mayor to serve a limited term. Meetings are presided over by the Mayor, who is elected at-large by voters of the city.

The City Recorder/City Judge is entrusted with two major functions: administering the city judicial system and maintaining vital city records, billing, and licensing services. These services include collecting city property taxes, ensuring liquor store compliance, and issuing taxi-cab and beer permits. City residents can pay utility bills, purchase city trash cans, apply for property tax rebates and city business licenses at the City Recorder/City Judge office.

The City Attorney oversees, prepares, reviews, and interprets ordinances, resolutions, and contracts; provides legal support to the Mayor, City Council, staff, boards and committees; and manages litigation in which the city may be involved. Periodic updating of the Gallatin Municipal Code, published by the Municipal Code Corporation, is coordinated by the City Attorney. The Municipal Code includes the City Charter, as well as other City ordinances which are permanent.

Education
Board of Education
Gallatin's schools are governed by the Sumner County Board of Education. The board consists of eleven elected representatives from each of the eleven single-member districts in the county. The members serve staggered four-year terms. They oversee the Director of Schools, Del Phillips, who serves under contract to the board. The board conducts monthly meetings that are open to the public. The school system's General Purpose School Fund budget during the 2020–21 school year was approximately $271 million.

The county-wide school system consists of approximately 4,300 employees and 49 schools. Approximately 29,400 students were enrolled in the county school system as of August 2020.

Schools

Elementary schools (K–5)
 Benny Bills Elementary School
 Guild Elementary School (also pre-K)
 Howard Elementary School (also pre-K)
 Liberty Creek Elementary School
 Station Camp Elementary School (also pre-K)
 Union Elementary STEM and Demonstration School (year-round school)
 Vena Stuart Elementary School

Middle schools (6–8)
 Joe Shafer Middle School
 Liberty Creek Middle School
 Station Camp Middle School
 Rucker-Stewart Middle School

High schools (9–12)
 Gallatin High School
 Liberty Creek High School
 Station Camp High School

Alternative schools
 R. T. Fischer Alternative School (K–12)

Private schools
 Saint John Vianney Catholic School (pre-K–8)
 Southside Christian School (K–12)
 Sumner Academy (pre-K–8)

Higher education

Volunteer State Community College is a public two-year community college. Popularly known as Vol State, it is part of the Tennessee Board of Regents system.  The main campus is located in Gallatin. There are also degree granting centers at McGavock High School in Nashville and Vol State at Livingston in Overton County. Additional class sites are located at the Highland Crest campus in Robertson County, and in Macon County and Wilson County.  Since its 1971 inception, more than 150,000 persons have attended the college. Currently, more than 8,000 students are enrolled in the average fall semester. The college has a diverse mix of students ranging in age from teens to senior adults. They come from counties across the service area, many states around the US and more than 25 countries. Vol State has more than 70 programs in five grand divisions: humanities, social science and education, allied health, business and math and science.

Welch College is a private Free Will Baptist, 4-year Christian college in Gallatin. Founded in 1942, it is one of several higher learning institutions associated with the National Association of Free Will Baptists. As of 2019, Welch College served 431 students from nearly two dozen states and several foreign countries. It offers 40 majors with its top programs including theological studies, premed/nursing, business, teacher education and music.

Media
Print
One local newspaper covers events in Gallatin: The Gallatin Newspaper, published on Thursdays. The city's original newspaper, The Gallatin News Examiner, founded in 1859, ceased publication in 2017.

Radio and television
Gallatin received its first local radio station in August 1948 when WHIN 1010 AM, went on the air. Owned at one time by the record mogul Randy Wood, the station still serves Sumner County with country music, local sports and coverage of NASCAR racing.

WHIN broadcast only in the daytime. Starting in 1950, the on-air studios at night were the production site for Dot Records. Its original headquarters were in the town.  Six years later, Dot moved to Hollywood, California.

WHIN was joined by an FM station in December 1960 when 104.5 came on the air. The FM station has broadcast under many call letters. Probably its most famous days were in the late 1970s and 1980s, when it was known as KX (pronounced Kicks) 104, a popular music station that battled with Nashville stations for top listenership. During that time the station was owned by Ron Bledsoe, a former employee in his younger years, who commanded CBS Records in Nashville. 

In the early 21st century, the station is owned by Citadel sports radio station WGFX. It targets the Nashville market and is the flagship station for the Tennessee Titans and Tennessee Volunteers.

WMRO (1560) came to the air in 1994 to serve the community. It plays an automated Hot AC format, along with local religious programming on Sunday mornings.

Volunteer State Community College operates a radio and television station. The student-run radio station, WVCP, broadcasts on 88.5 MHz FM, and plays music of various formats. 

The  television station is broadcast on Comcast Cable channel 19. The channel displays local announcements related to the college and the Gallatin/Sumner County area. The audio portion of the channel is a simulcast of the radio station. The channel also airs educational programs, usually at high school or college levels. Gallatin City Council meetings, Sumner County School Board meetings and Sumner County Commission meetings are also broadcast by the station.

Infrastructure
Transportation
  /  U.S. Route 31E / Tennessee State Route 6 (Nashville Pike)
  /  Tennessee State Route 386 / U.S. Route 31E Bypass (Vietnam Veterans Boulevard)
  Tennessee State Route 109 
  Tennessee State Route 25 (Red River Road)
  Tennessee State Route 174 (Long Hollow Pike) / (Water Avenue) / (Dobbins Pike)
Major roadways leading in and out of Gallatin include State Route 386 ("Vietnam Veterans Boulevard"), U.S. Highway 31E, State Route 109 and State Route 25. U.S. 31E, also known as "Nashville Pike" or "Gallatin Road", is the main thoroughfare through town. State Route 109 forms a bypass west of the downtown area, and State Route 386 is a controlled access highway that ends in Gallatin and connects the area to Interstate 65 to the west.

The Nashville Metropolitan Transit Authority (MTA) provides a daily bus service from Gallatin to downtown Nashville, with stops along the way.

The Sumner County Regional Airport provides air transportation in and out of Gallatin. The facility is equipped with one  runway with a 1,000 grass overrun. It also provides fueling and maintenance services.

The Regional Transportation Authority has future plans to expand the current Music City Star commuter railway to include a line running between Gallatin and Nashville, with a stop in Hendersonville.

History

Tennessee State Route 6 and Tennessee State Route 25 were the two original state routes in Gallatin, established between 1919 and 1925. SR 25 was extended west into Robertson County in 1925. US 31E was one of the first U.S. routes commissioned in November 1926. The only major change to the route since its commissioning has been the creation of a 4 lane highway that replaced the original Main Street route in 1980. Around 1940, another state route was created in Gallatin, State Route 109 (SR 109), it originally ran only between Gallatin and Portland. SR 109 got a major reroute to a restricted access bypass in the 1990s as part of a project to improve SR 109 from Gallatin to Portland. This project was completed in 2012. Tennessee State Route 386 (SR 386) was completed in 2007 in Gallatin.

Healthcare

Sumner Regional Medical Center is a hospital located in Gallatin. It has an emergency room, a nationally recognized cancer-treatment program, a wound care center, a cardiac catheterization lab, and a diagnostic sleep center. The staff can also perform digital mammography, interventional cardiology, neurosurgery, computerized knee replacement surgery, and PET therapy, among other procedures.

The Gallatin Health Department, with two locations, provides women and children's services, flu shots, special needs services, testing for sexually transmitted diseases and tuberculosis, family planning, and immunizations. The department also inspects restaurants, hotels, campgrounds, day care centers, schools, and other public facilities where food is served, to ensure proper sanitation. Additionally, it is responsible for investigating animal bites, rabies, and other animal-related diseases.

Notable people
John Rogan (1865–1905), second tallest verified human being ever at 8 ft 9 in (2.67m) 
Joe Blanton, MLB pitcher for the Los Angeles Dodgers
Zach Duke, MLB pitcher for the St. Louis Cardinals
Mike Elizondo, Record producer
William M. Gwin (1805–1885), senator from California 1850–55, again 1857–61; southern sympathizer, was born in Gallatin in 1805
Bill Hagerty, United States Senator from Tennessee, former U.S. ambassador to Japan.
Huell Howser (1945–2013), national public television personality was born in Gallatin in 1945
Lena Terrell Jackson (1865-1943), African-American educator in Nashville
Sondra Locke (1944–2018), actress and director
Kenneth Michael "Mookie" Moore, played college football at the University of Alabama (4 years) and Troy State University (1 year). He played for the National Football League teams of Washington Redskins, Denver Broncos and the Atlanta Falcons. He coaches with Station Camp High School Bison.
Ray Oldham (1951–2005), NFL defensive back for the Baltimore Colts, Pittsburgh Steelers, New York Giants and Detroit Lions
Nacole Rice, R&B recording artist, born in Gallatin in 1977
Tennys Sandgren, tennis player

See also

List of municipalities in Tennessee
National Register of Historic Places listings in Sumner County, Tennessee

Notes

References

Further readingSumner County Fact Book 2007–2008. The News Examiner & The Hendersonville Star News''. 2007.

External links

 Government

Gallatin Police Department
 General information
Gallatin Area Chamber of Commerce
Gallatin Public Library

 
1802 establishments in Tennessee
Cities in Tennessee
Cities in Sumner County, Tennessee
County seats in Tennessee

Cities in Nashville metropolitan area
Planned cities in the United States
Populated places established in 1802